The 2007 SEC men's basketball tournament took place on March 8–11, 2007 in Atlanta, Georgia at the Georgia Dome. The first, quarterfinal, and semifinal rounds were televised by Raycom/LF Sports, and the SEC Championship Game was televised by CBS.

Florida won the tournament and received the SEC's automatic bid to the NCAA tournament by beating Arkansas on March 11, 2007 by the score of 77 to 56.

Final SEC Regular Season Standings

Bracket

Asterisk denotes game ended in overtime.

References

SEC men's basketball tournament
-
2007 in sports in Georgia (U.S. state)
Basketball in Georgia (U.S. state)